Rho Capital Partners is a venture capital firm that actively invests in companies related to technology, new media, cleaning technology and healthcare.

Rho Fund Investors, a division of Rho Capital Partners, is a fund of funds (FoF), or fund that invests in other venture capital or private equity funds. Other divisions include Rho Canada.

History

Founding (1981-2003)
The firm, which is based in New York City, Palo Alto and Montreal, was founded in 1981. The group raised its "first multi-LP vehicle" in September 1999.

New investments (2004-2012)
Rho Ventures in 2005, based in New York, closed its fifth fund at $425 million, and said it would invest in communications, healthcare, and IT.

Rho had invested in approximately 200 venture stage companies in 2009. Among Rho's portfolio companies around then were Bluefly, Capstone Turbine, Celunol, Coulomb Technologies, Commerce One, Compaq, Dashlane, Enerkem, Human Genome Sciences, Innova Dynamics, IntraLinks, iVillage, JustFab, MedImmune, ReachLocal, SolarBridge Technologies, Tacoda, Tercica, Tripod.com, Vanda, Verenium, Vertrue, Vidyo, and Yantra.

The firm had raised over $2 billion since inception across 6 funds by 2010. The firm then was investing their sixth fund, Rho Ventures VI, a $510 million fund launched in 2008.

Recent history (2013-2021)
Rho Canada, a Canadian venture capital firm and division of Rho Capital Partners, announced in 2013, that it had closed a $100 million fund to make "early-stage" investments in various types of media and technology companies. By then, Rho Capital Partners had invested in companies like Accedian Networks and Beyond the Rack.

Rho Fund Investors in 2013 had $2 billion under management, and was described as a "Fund of Funds (FoF)," or fund that invests in other venture capital or private equity funds. Rho Fund Investors remained US based and a division of Rho Capital Partners. Rho Fund Investors committed a $600 million fund investment program to India. In 2013, Rho Ventures was being managed by Habib Kairouz, also a managing partner at Rho Capital Partners.

By 2017, Rho Capital Partners had also invested in ChargePoint. In October 2018, Rho Ventures' Martin Vogelbaum along with Syno Capital were reportedly aiming to raise $50 million for  Inning One Ventures LP, a new fund.

See also
List of venture capital firms

References

External links
Rho Capital Partners (company website)

Financial services companies established in 1981
Venture capital firms of the United States
American companies established in 1981
Privately held companies based in New York City